Leap Day is a Hong Kong television drama series produced by HK Television Entertainment and aired on ViuTV between 2 and 13 March 2020. Directed by Steve Law and written by Yellow Wong, the series stars Sofiee Ng, Chui Tien-you and Terrance Lau.

Synopsis 
Yeesa Cheung (Sofiee Ng), born on a leap day, believes her birthday is squeezed between 28 February and 1 March in common years. When she celebrates her birthday in 2017, she unexpectedly travels to 29 February 2020 in Sapporo. There she is greeted by two strangers, Ryan Ma (Chui Tien-you) and Yu Ka-chung (Terrance Lau), and finds her future self killed in a traffic accident. After she returns to 2017, only one second has passed, but the three have now to work together to circumvent their common destiny.

Production 
The crew describe the genre as romance more than sci-fi. The director, Steve Law, drew inspiration from a friend of his who was born on 29 February, before incorporating the idea of time travel. The filming in Hong Kong was completed before the overseas scenes. The crew initially planned to set the story in Taipei but later chose Sapporo to add to mystical and romantic elements. They received support and sponsor from the Sapporo Film Commission to cast Japanese characters at the desired spots. Yamano Hisaji, the coordinator of the collaborating producer company in Japan, was additionally cast to play the pivotal role of Kagawa Niro. With a limited budget, the crew had a tight filming schedule, hence some missing scenes had to be added by computer graphics and some written plots, such as the ending of Kagawa, were not filmed. The crash scene in Episode 9 was so complicated and expensive that, in order to ensure a smooth filming, Law and cinematographer Dino Wong found a visualiser to draw a storyboard, which is rare for a television series. The post-production was completed three days before the finale was aired.

Sofiee Ng worked with Steve Law on Margaret & David - Ex the Special Episode and Terrance Lau with Yellow Wong on Limited Education. They both accepted the roles without reading the script, based on the previous working experience with the crew. Ng had three ligaments torn during the filming of a chasing scene in Sapporo but went on with the shooting.

Cast and characters

Main characters
 Sofiee Ng as Yeesa Cheung (張麗紗)
Born on 29 February 1992, she believes she is unlucky because she has a quarter of birthday wishes compared to others. She aspires to be a professional designer but has not found a permanent job for three years since graduation from a design degree. She describes herself as being indecisive, as she is afraid of bearing responsibility for her decisions. Her character name is inspired by Riisa Naka, the voice actress for Makoto Konno of The Girl Who Leapt Through Time.
 Chui Tien-you as Ryan Ma (馬智浩)
He aspires to be a professional Japanese chef but is growingly unsatisfied with his job at a supermarket. He puts his mother and sister before himself.
Terrance Lau as Yu Ka-chung (余家聰)
A doctor of philosophy and chairman of Sacred Geometry Association. He distances himself from emotions.

Other characters
Deon Cheung as Cheung San (張辰) — Yeesa's father. A grocery store owner.
Kaki Sham as Pak Sai-kai 'Brazil Turtle' (白世繼; 巴西龜) — Vice-chairman of Sacred Geometry Association. Specialised in geometry and physics.
Ranya Lee as Fiona Tse (謝心雪) — One of Yeesa's best friends. A professional real estate agent.
Kiki Cheung as Lee Ka-man 'Kaka' (李嘉敏; 嘉嘉) — One of Yeesa's best friends. A beauty youtuber.
Anna Ng as Lee (李姐) — Ryan's mother
Krince Mak as Ma Tsz-ching (馬芷晴) — Ryan's younger sister. A senior secondary school student sitting for HKDSE in 2019
Will Or as Jonathan — Fiona's boyfriend. A start-up entrepreneur.
Eric Leung as Timothy — Kaka's boyfriend. A newspaper journalist. 
Yamano Hisaji as Kagawa Niro (香川二郎) — A beer deliveryman whose son suffers from chronic illness.
Leung Tin-chak as 'Jesus' (耶穌) — Member of Sacred Geometry Association. Specialised in conspiracy theories.
Esther So as 'Tripper' (跳掣) — Member of Sacred Geometry Association. Specialised in hypnosis.
Kwan Wing-yu as 'Kwan Yu' (關羽) — Member of Sacred Geometry Association. Specialised in dimensional analysis.
Cheng Man-hei as 'Alien' — Member of Sacred Geometry Association. Specialised in Extraterrestrial studies.
Ho Kai-wa as Thomas — Ryan's coworker at a supermarket.
Okizaki Chinatsu as Minamino Miko (南野美子) — Yeesa's mother. A native of Sapporo.

Episodes

Theme music and song 
The original scores, opening and ending themes were composed by Day Tai and his team at D Dome Music.

"Sei nin yat yu", composed, written, arranged, produced and sung by Chui Tien-you, was used as the ending song of Episode 9 instead of the normal ending theme. In the story, Ryan gives this song to Yeesa before he leaves Hong Kong for a half-year training in Sapporo.

Accolades

|-
| 2020
| Asian Academy Creative Awards
| Best Drama Series – National Winner for Hong Kong
| Leap Day
| 
|
|-
| 2021
| Asia Contents Award
| Best Actor
| Terrance Lau
| 
|
|}

Prequel and sequel 

At ViuTV 2021, the channel's presentation show aired on 17 October 2020, a drama series titled 940920 was announced, alluding to the secret code between Yeesa and Ka-chung in Leap Day. The series will be produced by the same crew that produced Leap Day and will star Sofiee Ng, Terrance Lau and Cecilia Choi. It will be both a prequel and sequel to Leap Day, taking place in two universes and centred around Ka-chung. In the teaser trailer, the new character played by Choi discusses parallel universe with Ka-chung and invites him to be the first member of the Sacred Geometry Association she founded, whereas Yeesa expresses her wish to stay at a universe where she is a stranger. The story was originally set in Hong Kong and Yilan, Taiwan and filming was planned for the spring of 2021. However, the schedule was delayed by the global coronavirus pandemic. In May 2021, Law announced that due to force majeure, the script had to be rewritten to set in Hong Kong only and filming began in September.

940920 was broadcast as a ten-episode series on ViuTV, premiering on 7 March 2022.

References

External links
Official website at ViuTV
 
 — Promotional Instagram account

ViuTV dramas
Hong Kong drama television series
Romantic fantasy television series
Hong Kong time travel television series
Television series set in 2017
Television series set in 2020
2020 in Hong Kong television
Cantonese-language television shows
2020s Hong Kong television series
2020 Hong Kong television series debuts